The Minnehaha Creek Watershed District's mission is to collaborate with public and private partners to protect and improve land and water for current and future generations. The Minnehaha Creek in its name refers to the water link from Lake Minnetonka to the Mississippi River. The watershed is much bigger than that lake or creek, and includes 29 communities, and encompasses . It stretches West from about Minnehaha Falls to Saint Bonifacius and North to Maple Plain. It includes 129 lakes and 8 major creeks in Hennepin and Carver counties. Some of the lakes in the district are: Bde Maka Ska, Harriet, Nokomis, Parley, Minnewashta and Katrina.

Through collaborative planning, aligned investments, streamlined permitting, technical expertise and educating/engaging residents, the MCWD seeks to create a landscape of vibrant communities within the watershed. Established in 1967, the MCWD was created under the Minnesota Watershed District Act. The 1955 act charged watershed districts with integrating water management efforts among city, county, and state agencies. Districts receive funding through local property taxes.

The District's office is located in Minnetonka, Minnesota. Its leadership is made up of seven Board Members and a Citizen Advisory Committee.

External links
 Minnehaha Creek Watershed District

Geography of Minnesota
Watersheds of the United States
Water organizations in the United States